Three ships of the Royal Navy have been named HMS Cattistock after the Cattistock hunt:

 , launched in 1917, was a  minesweeper that served in World War I
 , launched in 1940, was a Type I  that served in World War II
 , launched in 1981, is a

Battle honours
 North Sea, 1941-45
 Atlantic, 1942-1944
 Normandy, 1944
 Kuwait, 1991

References
 

Royal Navy ship names